The Topeka Plaindealer was a newspaper in Topeka, Kansas serving its African American community. It was established in 1899 by Nick Chiles who continued as its editor and publisher during his lifetime. He died in 1929, and the paper continued until 1958. According to a historian reporting in the Topeka Capital-Journal it became the bestselling African American newspaper west of the Mississippi River.

References

Defunct newspapers published in Kansas